The 2022 Northwestern State Demons baseball team represented Northwestern State University during the 2022 NCAA Division I baseball season. The Demons played their home games at H. Alvin Brown–C. C. Stroud Field and were led by sixth–year head coach Bobby Barbier. They were members of the Southland Conference.

Preseason

Southland Conference Coaches Poll
The Southland Conference Coaches Poll was released on February 11, 2022, and the Demons were picked to finish fifth in the conference with 55 votes and two first place votes.

Preseason All-Southland Team
The following players were named to the 2022 Preseason All-Southland Team, voted on by the league's coaches.

1st Team
Daunte Stuart – Second Baseman
Cal Carver – Starting Pitcher

2nd Team
Donovan Ohnoutka – Starting Pitcher
Drayton Brown – Relief Pitcher

Personnel

Schedule and results

References

Northwestern State Demons
Northwestern State Demons baseball seasons
Northwestern State Demons baseball